Marriage Strike or Matrimonial Strike is a 1935 German comedy film directed by Georg Jacoby and starring Trude Marlen, Paul Richter and Erika von Thellmann. It was remade in 1953.

The film's sets were designed by the art directors Erich Kettelhut and Max Mellin.

Cast

References

External links

German comedy films
1935 comedy films
Films directed by Georg Jacoby
Films of Nazi Germany
Films set in Bavaria
UFA GmbH films
German films based on plays
German black-and-white films
1930s German films